Vaona may refer to:
Ancharius brevibarbis, fish
Ancharius fuscus, fish